

Medalists

Standings
Men's Competition

References
Complete 1991 Mediterranean Games Standings Archived

1991 in water polo
Sports at the 1991 Mediterranean Games
1991
1991